Fischach is a river of the state Salzburg in Austria. It is a right tributary of the Salzach near Bergheim.

References

Rivers of Salzburg (state)
Rivers of Austria